The list of Mister Singapore to represent to Mister International, Mister Global, Mister World, Manhunt International, and Man of the World

Grand Slam Pageants 
Color keys

Mister International

Mister Global

Mister World Singapore

Manhunt International

Man of the World

Minor International Pageants 

Color key

Mister Global Teen

Best Model of the World

Mister Asian International

Mister Culture World

Mister Culture Asia World

Past 

Color key

Mr. Tourism International

Mr. Intercontinental

Mr. International

See also 

Miss Singapore Universe
Miss World Singapore
Miss Singapore International
Miss Earth Singapore

References

External links 

Beauty pageants in Singapore
Singapore
Male beauty pageants
Man of the World (pageant)
Mister Global by country